Ukashir Farooq (born 3 January 1996) is a Scottish former professional boxer who competed from 2015 to 2021. He held the British bantamweight title from 2018 to 2019 and challenged once for the Commonwealth bantamweight title in 2019.

Early life 

Ukashir Farooq, known by friends and family as "Kash", was born on 3 January 1996 in Gujranwala, Punjab, Pakistan. One of three brothers, he and his family immigrated to England and applied for asylum in 2002, initially living in London before being relocated to Glasgow, Scotland. He first entered a boxing gym in 2010 after being invited by a friend. In an interview with The Herald, Farooq recalled: "I wasn’t interested in boxing at the start" and "...the trainer saw me hitting a few bags and asked me to come back. I came back and did some sparring and it just continued from there. Now I love boxing."

Professional career 

Farooq made his professional debut on 25 October 2015, winning a four round points decision over Craig Derbyshire at the Radisson Blu Hotel in Glasgow.

After winning his first seven fights, he challenged Scott Allan for the British Scottish Area bantamweight title on 23 November 2017 at the Radisson Blu Hotel. Farooq won via eighth-round technical knockout (TKO).

On 27 September 2018, he faced Jamie Wilson at the St. Andrew’s Sporting Club in Glasgow. Farooq scored a TKO victory 73 seconds into the first round to capture the vacant British bantamweight title, becoming the first Scottish boxer in 21 years to do so.

The first defence of his British title came on 30 November 2018, against Iain Butcher at the Emirates Arena, Glasgow. Farooq retained his title with a unanimous decision over twelve rounds.

He defended his title for the second time on 25 April 2019, against undefeated Kyle Williams at the Radisson Blu Hotel, winning via fifth-round TKO.

On 17 August 2019, Farooq beat Duane Winters by first-round knockout (KO) at the Radisson Blu Hotel to retained his British bantamweight title.

On 16 November 2019, he challenged Commonwealth bantamweight champion Lee McGregor at the Emirates Arena, Glasgow. Farooq lost a highly disputed and controversial split decision in which many felt Farooq should have been the clear victor.

In January 2022, in a statement released via St. Andrew's Sporting Club, Farooq announced his retirement from boxing at the age of 26. Citing "unforeseen circumstances", the statement thanked the British Boxing Board of Control, saying it's procedures kept the "health and safety of the boxers paramount at all times". It was also revealed that Farooq will be taking the role of "Head of Talent" for the St. Andrew's Sporting Club.

Professional boxing record

See also
Asian-Scots

References 

Living people
1996 births
Scottish male boxers
Bantamweight boxers
British Boxing Board of Control champions
Boxers from Glasgow
Sportspeople from Gujranwala
Pakistani emigrants to Scotland
Pakistani male boxers